Bulbophyllum lemniscatum is a species of orchid in the genus Bulbophyllum.

External links 
 
The Bulbophyllum-Checklist
The Internet Orchid Species Photo Encyclopedia

lemniscatum
Taxa named by Joseph Dalton Hooker